Theodore Leopold Friedman (June 6, 1890 – August 25, 1971), known as Ted Lewis, was an American entertainer, bandleader, singer, and musician. He fronted a band and touring stage show that presented a combination of jazz, comedy, and nostalgia that was a hit with the American public before and after World War II. He was known by the moniker "Mr. Entertainment" or Ted "Is Everybody Happy?" Lewis. He died of lung failure in August 1971.

Early life

Born in Circleville, Ohio, Lewis was one of the first Northern musicians to imitate the style of New Orleans jazz musicians who came to New York in the 1910s. He first recorded in 1917 with Earl Fuller's Jazz Band, then engaged at Rector’s restaurant in Manhattan, a band which was attempting to copy the sound of the city's newest sensation, the Original Dixieland Jass Band, which was playing at Reisenweber’s restaurant in New York City.   

Although the piccolo was the first instrument Lewis learned, he also played the C-melody saxophone but was known principally as a clarinetist throughout his long career. His primary instrument was a Bb Albert System clarinet. 

Based on his earliest recordings, Lewis did not seem able to do much on the clarinet other than trill in its upper register. Promoting one recording the Victor catalog stated: "The sounds as of a dog in his dying anguish are from Ted Lewis' clarinet". As his career gained momentum he refined his style under the influence of the first New Orleans clarinetists to relocate in New York, Larry Shields, Alcide Nunez, and Achille Baquet.

Career

By 1919, Lewis was leading his own band, and had a recording contract with Columbia Records, which marketed him as their answer to the Original Dixieland Jass Band who recorded for Victor records. For a time (as the company did with Paul Whiteman) Columbia gave him a special record label featuring his picture. 

At the start of the 1920s, he was being promoted as one of the leading lights of the mainstream form of jazz popular at the time. Although Lewis's clarinet style became increasingly corny, he certainly knew what good clarinet playing sounded like, for he hired musicians like Benny Goodman, Jimmy Dorsey, Frank Teschemacher, and Don Murray to play clarinet in his band. Over the years his band also included jazz greats Muggsy Spanier on trumpet and George Brunies on trombone. Ted Lewis's band was second only to the Paul Whiteman band in popularity during the early 1920s, and arguably played a more authentic form of jazz with less pretension than Whiteman.

Lewis recorded for Columbia from 1919 to 1933. Subsequently, he recorded for Decca from 1934 through the 1940s. In 1932, Lewis recorded "In a Shanty in Old Shanty Town", which he had performed in the film The Crooner with his orchestra. The recording reached number one in radio polls and remained there for ten weeks.

One of Lewis's most memorable songs was "Me and My Shadow" with which he frequently closed his act. Around 1928, Lewis noticed an usher named Eddie Chester mimicking his movements during his act. He hired Chester to follow him on stage as his shadow during "Me and My Shadow".  Chester was followed by four African-American shadows, the most famous being Charles "Snowball" Whittier, making Ted Lewis one of the first prominent white entertainers to showcase African-American performers (arguably in stereotypical ways) onstage, on film, and eventually on network television.

Ted Lewis and His Orchestra was one of the featured entertainers at the 1939 Golden Gate International Exposition – Pageant of the Pacific on Treasure Island (Sunday, August 13, 1939, Program of Special Attractions and Events indicates that the Ted Lewis Orchestra performed from 2:45 to 3:45 p.m. and from 5:00 to 6:00 p.m. in the Temple Compound and from 8:30 to 11:30 p.m. in the Treasure Island Music Hall for a free dance).

Lewis's band continued to play in the same general style throughout the Great Depression, but was essentially the musical backdrop for his act as a showman. He remained successful during an era when many bands broke up. Through it all he retained his famous catchphrase Is everybody happy? and Yessir!. 

Lewis adopted a battered top hat for sentimental, hard-luck tunes (he called himself "The High-Hatted Tragedian of Song"). Frequently he would stray from song lyrics, improvising patter around them. This gave the effect of Lewis "speaking" the song spontaneously: "When ma' baby... when ma' baby smiles at me... gee, what a wonderful, wonderful light that comes to her eyes... look at that light, folks..."

Lewis kept his band together through the 1950s and continued to make appearances in Las Vegas and on television, appearing as the mystery guest on What's My Line?, This Is Your Life and Person To Person in the 1950s, and  Hollywood Palace and others in the 1960s and 1970s. 

True to his vaudeville beginnings, he created a visual as well as a musical act. His physical presence with props like his top hat, white-tipped cane and clarinet combined with bits of visual humor and dancing were as important to him and as crucial to his popularity as his music.

Films
Lewis and his band appeared in a few early talkie movie musicals in 1929, notably the Warner Brothers revue The Show of Shows. The first of several films titled with Lewis' catchphrase, Is Everybody Happy? also premiered in 1929, while 1935 saw Lewis and his band performing several numbers in the film Here Comes the Band.

In 1941 the band was recruited at the last minute, along with the Andrews Sisters, to furnish musical numbers for the Abbott and Costello comedy Hold That Ghost (1941), released by Universal Studios on August 6, 1941. Musical numbers cut from the feature were released by Universal separately on September 3, 1941, in a short subject entitled  Is Everybody Happy?

In 1943 Columbia Pictures mounted a feature-length biographical film of Lewis—yet again titled Is Everybody Happy?—with actor Michael Duane portraying the bandleader and lip synching to Lewis's recordings.

There is an extended caricature of Lewis in the Warner Brothers short Speaking of the Weather (Tashlin, 1937), playing Plenty of Money and You, and a briefer one (performed by Daffy Duck) in Person to Bunny (1960).

Personal life

Lewis married Adah Becker (1897 – May 31, 1981) in 1915. She was a ballerina when Ted met her that same year in Rochester New York.  Only six weeks later they were married in three separate ceremonies on the same day, first by a justice of the peace, next by a rabbi and finally on stage that night.  They remained married for 56 years until the death of Ted.  Adah gave up her dancing career to become his secretary, business manager and loving wife throughout her husband's long career. Once married, Ted and Adah lived in a 15-room apartment overlooking New York City's Central Park for the remainder of their lives.

Lewis died in his sleep in New York on August 25, 1971, of lung failure at the age of 81.  Following a Jewish funeral service in New York City, his body was brought to Circleville where thousands walked past his coffin.  Rabbi Jerome D. Folkman who officiated remarked, "The song has ended, but the memory lingers on."  The burial was held at the local Forest Cemetery.  Lewis's stone, in the family plot, has his hat and cane incised upon it.  His wife Adah, who died on May 31, 1981, rests beside him.

Upon his death, the City of New York, Yale and Harvard Universities and the Smithsonian Institution asked Adah for his memorabilia.  She politely declined, saying Ted wanted everything to come back to the "Capital of the World", Circleville, Ohio.  The Ted Lewis Museum, located across the street from where he was born, was dedicated on June 5, 1977.  Adah, who had dreamed of a museum in the hometown that Ted loved so much, was present for the museum's opening ceremonies.  Large numbers of celebrities, relatives, friends and Ted Lewis admirers from everywhere attended the dedication.  The Ted Lewis Theater within the museum provides an opportunity for visitors to see Ted Lewis in performance by means of early TV and movie clips.

References

External links

 
 
 Ted Lewis recordings at the Discography of American Historical Recordings.
 Ted Lewis: Master Showman of Jazz at The Syncopated Times
 Ted Lewis (1890-1971) at Red Hot Jazz Archive
 Ted Lewis Museum in Circleville, Ohio

1890 births
1971 deaths
Dixieland jazz musicians
American jazz bandleaders
American jazz clarinetists
American jazz singers
Big band bandleaders
Singers from Ohio
People from Circleville, Ohio
Vaudeville performers
20th-century clarinetists
20th-century American conductors (music)
20th-century American singers
Jazz musicians from Ohio
Biograph Records artists